Andrew K. Barkis (born 1968) is a Republican member of the Washington House of Representatives. He was appointed in February 2016 to succeed fellow Republican Graham Hunt, who resigned.

He is the ranking minority member on the Community Development, Housing & Tribal Affairs Committee. He also serves on the House Consumer Protection & Business Committee.

Awards 
 2020 Guardians of Small Business. Presented by NFIB.

Personal life
Barkis lives in Lacey with his wife Lisa. They have 2 children.

References

External links
 Legislative homepage
 Campaign website

Living people
People from Chehalis, Washington
People from Lacey, Washington
Republican Party members of the Washington House of Representatives
Seattle University alumni
Centralia College alumni
21st-century American politicians
1968 births